Overtones may refer to:

 Overtone, a frequency higher than the fundamental frequency of a sound
 Overtone band in spectroscopy, at a frequency higher than the fundamental band 
 Overtone (software), an open source audio programming environment based on Clojure and SuperCollider synthesis engine
 Overtones (album), an album by Just Jack
 The Overtones, a British doo-wop band
 California Golden Overtones, a collegiate a cappella group
 Rustic Overtones, a rock/jazz/funk band from Maine, United States
 "Strange Overtones", a song by David Byrne and Brian Eno
 Overtone (musical group), an a cappella group from South Africa
 Overtone, a type of poem writing like that of an autobiographical overtone.

See also

 Overton (disambiguation)
 Overtown (disambiguation)
 
 
 Over (disambiguation)
 Tone (disambiguation)